“For Faultless Service” medal – is a medal of Azerbaijani Republic. The medal was approved by Law of Azerbaijan Republic by Decree No. 330 – IIQ, on May 17, 2002.

Description
For Faultless Service medal consists of a narrow plate decorated with national ornaments and a round bronze plate of 25 mm diameter. Crossed rifles and an anchor are described against a background with an eagle with opened wings in the front side of the medal. There is a crescent and an eight-pointed star at the top and garlands of oak leaves at the bottom of the medal.

The 3rd class medal is silver color, the second class is gold color, the 1st class is gold color, the crescent and the eight-pointed star are white color, the rifles are silver color and the anchor is black color. Rare side of the medal is flat with “For 20 years faultless service” words on the 1st class medal, “For 15 years of faultless service” on the 2nd class medal, with “For 10 years of faultless service” on the 3rd class medal in the center and with a crescent and an eight-pointed star on a national ornament. “Azerbaijani Republic” words at the top and “Armed Forces” words at the bottom are carved along the circle.

The medal is pinned to the chest with a satin ribbon of 27x43 mm size and a ring and loop. There are vertical olive and white color stripes of 1 mm width and blue and white color vertical stripes of 3 mm located in a sequence from the corners to the center of the satin ribbon. There is one vertical 1 mm gold color stripe on the 1st class medal, 2-3 such stripes on the 2nd and 3rd class medals. 
A 27x9 mm mould covered with the same satin is attached to the medal for pinning to the chest.

References 

Orders, decorations, and medals of Azerbaijan
2002 establishments in Azerbaijan
Awards established in 2002